Norine A. Kasperik is an American politician and a former Republican member of the Wyoming House of Representatives representing District 32.

Education
Kasperik earned her diploma from the UPMC Shadyside School of Nursing, her BSN from Regis University, and her MS in nursing administration from the University of Mary.

Elections
2012 Kasperik was unopposed for both the August 21, 2012 Republican Primary, winning with 1,175 votes, and the November 6, 2012 General election, winning with 3,741 votes.
2010 When Republican Representative Timothy Hallinan retired and left the District 32 seat open, Kasperik won the August 17, 2010 Republican Primary with 1,232 votes (58.5%), and won the November 2, 2010 General election with 2,391 votes (83.2%) against Democratic nominee Duffy Jenniges, a perennial candidate who sought the seat in 1998, 2000, 2002, 2004, 2006, and 2008.

References

External links
Official page at the Wyoming Legislature
 

Place of birth missing (living people)
Year of birth missing (living people)
Living people
Republican Party members of the Wyoming House of Representatives
People from Gillette, Wyoming
Regis University alumni
University of Mary alumni
Women state legislators in Wyoming
21st-century American politicians
21st-century American women politicians